Bruce Goldstone is an American children’s book author and illustrator.

Goldstone grew up in Ohio. In addition to his children’s book work, he also writes textbooks and is a graphic designer for a theater company.<ref>{{Cite web|title="About the Author", BruceGoldstone.com|url=http://www.brucegoldstone.com/about}}</ref>

His New York Times-bestselling book Great Estimations and its sequel, Greater Estimations, teach children the skill of visually estimating large quantities.

Bibliography
 The Beastly Feast, illustrations by Blair Lent, Henry Holt and Co., 1998
 Ten Friends, illustrations by Heather Cahoon, Henry Holt and Co., 2001
 Bip in a Book, written with Marcel Marceau, photographs by Steven Rothfeld; Stewart, Tabori & Chang, 2001
 Why Is Blue Dog Blue?, written with George Rodrigue, illustrations by George Rodrigue; Stewart, Tabori & Chang, 2001
 A Gnome's Christmas, illustrations by Rien Poortvliet, Harry N. Abrams, Inc., 2004
 Great Estimations, Henry Holt and Co., 2006
 Greater Estimations, Henry Holt and Co., 2008
 100 Ways to Celebrate 100 Days, Henry Holt and Co., 2010
 Awesome Autumn, Henry Holt and Co., 2012
 That's a Possibility!, Henry Holt and Co., 2013
 I See a Pattern Here, Henry Holt, 2015Wonderful Winter, Henry Holt, 2016
 Spectacular Spring, Henry Holt, 2018Super Summer'', Henry Holt, 2019

References

External links
 
 Publisher's Author Page*

Living people
American children's writers
Year of birth missing (living people)